Valery Loginov (born 13 December 1955), is a Soviet and Russian chess Grandmaster (GM) (1991) who from 1992 to 1995 played for Uzbekistan. Three-times Uzbekistani Chess Championship winner (1976, 1982, 1984), Saint Petersburg City Chess Championship (2000, 2004, 2005), Chess Olympiad team silver medalist (1992).

Biography
After graduating from Leningrad Institute of Pulp and Paper Technology, Valery Loginov worked for many years in Uzbekistan. Three times he won the Uzbekistani Chess Championship: 1976, 1982, and 1984. In 1991, in Azov Valery Loginov won a bronze medal with Uzbekistan team in the last Soviet Team Chess Championship. Many times he won [Budapest]] International Chess Tournaments (1990, 1991), as well as the Budapest International Chess Tournament Series First Saturday (1993, 1994) and Spring Open (1994). Valery Loginov has also won international chess tournaments in Ljubljana (1995), in Graz (1998), and in St. Petersburg (1999). After moving to Russia, he three times won Saint Petersburg City Chess Championships: 2000, 2004, and 2005.

Valery Loginov played for Uzbekistan in the Chess Olympiads:
 In 1992, at first board in the 30th Chess Olympiad in Manila (+1, =6, -6) and won team silver medal,
 In 1994, at first board in the 31st Chess Olympiad in Moscow (+3, =6, -2).

In 1989, he was awarded the FIDE International Master (IM) title and received the FIDE Grandmaster (GM) title two years later.

References

External links

Valery Loginov chess games at 365chess.com

1955 births
Living people
People from Syzran
Russian chess players
Soviet chess players
Uzbekistani chess players
Chess grandmasters
Chess Olympiad competitors